The 2014–15 CERH Women's European Cup was the 9th season of Europe's premier female club roller hockey competition organized by CERH.

Following several knockout rounds, the four best teams contested a final four tournament, won by Portuguese club Benfica.

Teams
TH: Title holders

Round dates
The schedule of the competition is as follows (draw held at CERH headquarters in Lisbon, Portugal, on 6 September 2014).

Preliminary round
The first-leg matches were played on 1 November, and the second-leg matches were played on 13 December 2014.

|}

Quarter-finals
The first-leg matches were played on 17 January, and the second-leg matches will be played on 7 February 2015.

|}

Final four
The final four tournament took place on 14 and 15 March 2015. It was hosted by Manlleu at the Pavelló Municipal d'Esports in Manlleu, Spain.

All times listed below are local time (UTC+01:00).

Semi-finals

Final

See also
2014–15 CERH European League
2014–15 CERS Cup

References

External links
 

Rink Hockey European Female League
CERH
CERH
2014 in Spanish women's sport
2015 in Spanish women's sport
International roller hockey competitions hosted by Spain